In Greek mythology, Brettia (Ancient Greek: Βρεττίας) was the eponymous nymph of Abrettene, Mysia.

Note

References 

 Stephanus of Byzantium, Stephani Byzantii Ethnicorum quae supersunt, edited by August Meineike (1790-1870), published 1849. A few entries from this important ancient handbook of place names have been translated by Brady Kiesling. Online version at the Topos Text Project.

Nymphs